Kesari is a 2019 Indian Hindi-language war film written and directed by Anurag Singh. It was jointly produced by Aruna Bhatia, Karan Johar, Hiroo Yash Johar, Apoorva Mehta, and Sunir Khetarpal under the banners of Dharma Productions, Cape of Good Films, Azure Entertainment, and Zee Studios. The film stars Akshay Kumar with Parineeti Chopra in a special appearance, Vikram Singh Chauhan, Sarwar, Vansh Bhardwaj, Jaspreet Singh, Vivek Saini, Vikram Kochhar, and Rakesh Sharma in supporting roles. It follows the events leading to the Battle of Saragarhi, a battle between 21 Sikh soldiers of the 36th Sikh Regiment of the British Indian Army and 10,000 Afridi and Orakzai Pashtun tribesmen in 1897.

Initially planned as a production collaboration between Salman Khan and Johar with Kumar starring in the lead role, Kesari was announced in October 2017, with Kumar and Johar reprising their responsibilities; Khan later quit the project. Parineeti Chopra was cast as the wife of Kumar's character. Principal photography for the film began in January 2018 and concluded in December. The soundtrack was composed by Tanishk Bagchi, Arko Pravo Mukherjee, Chirantan Bhatt, Jasbir Jassi, Gurmoh and Jasleen Royal with lyrics written by Kumaar, Manoj Muntashir, Kunwar Juneja and Bagchi.

The film was released in India during the Holi festival, on 21 March 2019. It received positive reviews from critics, who appreciated performances of ensemble cast, visuals, production values, art direction, action sequences, and tribute, it had a good start at the box office, while the opening day morning collection was affected by Holi-related celebrations. The film grossed over 100 crore worldwide in its opening weekend.

Plot
Ishar Singh is a havildar in the Sikh Regiment of the British Indian Army. His superior and commander is an arrogant British officer, who deems all Indians to be cowards, and is jealous of Ishar Singh because of his superior fighting skills.

The regiment is posted at Gulistan Fort, on the border between British-held territory and the Afghan border. Once, while on a border patrol, the troops see a group of Afghan tribesmen, led by one Saidullah, on the verge of killing a married Afghan woman because she refuses to accept her husband, who has been chosen by her family without her consent. The British officer refuses to intervene and save the woman saying she is an Afghan citizen and does not reside in British territory; and since it is a family matter pertaining to tribal custom, and the policy of the British Raj is to not interfere in such matters. In defiance of the orders of his officer, Ishar Singh goes ahead and intervenes, fights off the tribesmen, and rescues the woman by killing her husband. 

The British officer writes a strong report informing his commanding officer, who sits at the nearby Lockhart fort, of Ishar Singh's disobedience and insubordination. Soon enough, the Afghans attack the British-controlled Gulistan fort, but are held at bay by Ishar Singh who fights valiantly, killing many Afghans. Nevertheless, Ishar Singh is blamed by his superiors for his actions which caused the breach of peace with the Afghans. He is given a punishment transfer to Saragarhi fort, which sits between Gulistan and Lockhart forts, and enables communication between them. Ishar Singh duly travels to Saragarhi fort, where he finds the troop in a mess. He enforces discipline by punishing all to stay without food for an entire week. The troops are furious at first, but later begins to respect Ishar Singh after learning that he too was living without food. Meanwhile, Saidullah forms an alliance between the Afghan tribes and motivates them to mount an attack on British territories as a unified force. Ishar Singh and Lal Singh go to a nearby village in search of their informant who hadn't reported to them for over three days.

The British Commanding Officer Col. John Haughton from Lockhart fort sees the Afghan Forces marching towards Sargarhi and alerts Ishar. Ishar and his battalion see ten thousand tribesmen approaching and encircling the fort. Saidullah, with the entire Afghan army at his back, beheads the woman Ishar Singh had rescued earlier in front of the Saragarhi Fort. Despite the commanding officer's orders to abandon the fort and flee, Ishar Singh and his men decide to fight till death. Khuda Daad the cook volunteers to fight but Ishar Singh asks him to instead provide water to the injured soldiers (Including the Afghans). The Afghans initiate the battle, and Bhagwan Singh is the first to be killed. Gurmukh Singh, being an inexperienced soldier, is unable to fight, due to which Ishar Singh asks him to keep the CO updated regarding the battle, and decides to prolong the battle to prevent the Afghans from advancing to the Gulistan and Lockhart forts. As the battle prolongs, Lal Singh alone fights the Afghans outside the fort and dies while asking one of the sepoys to close the gate to the fort. The Afghans manage to destroy the back wall of the fort using explosives.

Ishar Singh remembers his wife Jeevani one last time after removing the stripes from his uniform and starts fighting the Afghans with a red-hot sword until he gets fatally stabbed. Saidullah kills Khuda Daad before himself being stabbed to death by Ishar while trying to remove his turban. Ishar's bravery impresses an Afghan chieftain who orders his men not to touch any Sikh's turban. He also says the Afghans have actually lost the battle because now it's too late for them to capture Gulistan and Lockhart forts also, because of the Saragarhi battle. At this another Afghan chieftains named Gul Badshah orders the signaling post to be lit up so Gurmukh Singh's painful screams can be heard as a consolation. As the Afghans set the post on fire, Gurmukh Singh emerges with his body on fire. He chants "Bole So Nihal, Sat Sri Akaal" thrice, grabs Gul Badshah and triggers the grenades attached to his body, resulting in a huge explosion. The shout echoes and reaches both the nearby forts. The Sikh soldiers present there also start chanting in the name of their Guru. The surviving Afghans loot the fort and eventually set it on fire. The British Parliament honours the fallen with a two-minute silence and posthumously awards them the British Order of Merit - the highest gallantry award an Indian soldier could receive.

Cast 

 Akshay Kumar as Havildar Ishar Singh
 Parineeti Chopra as Jeevani Kaur (special appearance)
 Mir Sarwar as Khan Masud
 Ashwath Bhatt as Gul Badshah Khan
 Rakesh Chaturvedi as Mullah Saidullah
 Suvinder Vicky as Nk. Lal Singh
 Vivek Saini as Sep. Jiwan Singh
 Vansh Bharadwaj as L/Nk. Chanda Singh
 Pritpal Pali as Sep. Gurmukh singh
 Vikram Kochhar as Sep. Gulab Singh
 Ravinder Pawar as Sep. Attar Singh
 Surmeet Singh Basra as Sep. Gurmukh Singh
 Ajit Singh Mahela as Sep. Nand Singh
 Sandeep Nahar as Sep. Buta Singh
 Harvinder Singh as Sep. Daya Singh
 Rakesh Sharma as Sep. Bhola Singh
 Adhrit Sharma as Sep. Uttam Singh
 Harbhagwan Singh as Sep. Bhaghwan Singh
 Rajdeep Singh Dhaliwal as Sep. Ram Singh
 Gurpreet Toti as Sep. Saheb Singh
 Harry Brar as Sep. Sunder Singh
 Pali Sandhu as Sep. Narayan Singh
 Vikram Singh Chauhan as Sep. Hira Singh
 Gagneet Singh Makhan as Sep. Jiwan Singh
 Brahma Mishra as Daad
 Jaspreet Singh as Taklu
 Toranj Kayvon as Gulwarien
 R. Bhakti Klein as Major Des-Voeux

Production

Development 
In 2017, Salman Khan and Karan Johar announced that they would be producing a film together based on the Battle of Saragarhi starring Akshay Kumar in the lead role. Media reports later speculated Khan left the project in favor of a similarly themed film starring Ajay Devgn, and in October that year, Johar and Kumar announced a statement about their collaboration on the film; that Khan had quit the film, and that it would be titled Kesari. Parineeti Chopra was confirmed for a minor role as the wife of Kumar's character, whom he had left behind at the village after joining the army.

Principal photography 
Principal photography began on 5 January 2018 and finished on 31 December 2018.

Music 

The music of the film is composed by Tanishk Bagchi, Arko Pravo Mukherjee, Chirantan Bhatt, Jasbir Jassi, Gurmoh and Jasleen Royal with lyrics written by Kumaar, Manoj Muntashir, Kunwar Juneja and Tanishk Bagchi.

Marketing and release 
Kumar released Kesaris first look poster on 12 September 2018, through Twitter. Another poster was released on India's Republic Day, 26 January 2019. The film's theatrical poster was released on 11 February 2019.

The following day, Dharma Productions released three videos titled "Glimpses of Kesari" on their YouTube channel, detailing the film's production. A second theatrical release poster for Kesari was released on 20 February 2019.

The first song of the film "Sanu Kehndi" was released on 27 February 2019, the second one "Teri Mitti" was released on 15 March 2019 and the full album was released on 18 March 2019.

Kesari was released worldwide during the Indian Holi festival, on 21 March 2019. It had a release on 4200 screens worldwide, 3600 screens of which were in India and the rest overseas.

Home video
Kesari was made available as VOD on Amazon Prime Video in May 2019.

Reception

Critical response
Rachit Gupta of The Times of India gave Kesari four stars out of five, praising its "technical brilliance, intricate writing and thundering performances". Taran Adarsh gave it four stars and felt it "chronicles a significant chapter from history brilliantly... Nationalism, patriotism, heroism, scale and soul – Kesari has it all". Writing for Times Now, Gaurang Chauhan rated the film three and a half stars out of five and opined, "Kesari is not the best patriotic film or action film to come out of Bollywood, but it surely is worth the time and money". Bollywood Hungama rated it four stars out of five, remarking, "On the whole, Kesari is a brave and inspirational tale of courage, with patriotism and the dramatic battle sequences being the USP of the film". Nandini Ramnath of Scroll.in writes, "Sluggishly paced until the interval and springing to life only in fits and starts in the second half, Kesari is a poor attempt to revisit a chapter in Indian military history that earned the admiration even of British colonizers." Though mainly positively received in India, the film was negatively received in the Muslim world, which saw the film's portrayal of the main antagonist as a Muslim maulana, as well as displaying rancor against a Sikh turban by Muslim Afghans as little more than Hindu Nationalist.

Box office
Its domestic gross was 182.30 crore and overseas gross 24.79 crore. It has grossed 207.09 crore worldwide. The film grossed over 100 crore worldwide in its opening weekend. It became the fastest 100 crore earning film in domestic net in 2019 for Bollywood films released till May. It eventually grossed over  worldwide in its fourth week.

Awards and nominations

Notes

References

External links
 
 Kesari on Bollywood Hungama
 

2019 films
Hindi-language films based on actual events
Action films based on actual events
War films based on actual events
2010s Hindi-language films
2010s action war films
Indian action war films
Indian historical action films
Films set in Afghanistan
Indian films based on actual events
Films about Sikhism
Films set in the British Raj
Films directed by Anurag Singh
Films set in 1897